The Jamaica Baptist Union is a Baptist Christian denomination, affiliated with the Baptist World Alliance, founded in 1849 in Jamaica. The headquarters is in Kingston, Jamaica. The president of the union is Rev. Dr. Glenroy Lalor.

History
The Baptist Union of Jamaica dates back to 1782 when George Liele, a formerly-enslaved man from Atlanta, Georgia, came to Jamaica and began preaching in Kingston. In 1814, the Baptist Missionary Society, a British organization, sent its first missionary to the island to open a school in Falmouth in Trelawny Parish, for the children of slaves. The ministry continued to grow and expand during British colonization.

Baptists are involved in the struggle for the abolition of slavery. After abolition, Baptists contributed to the creation of "Free Villages" for the newly emancipated people. This included the purchase of large parcels of land cut into small holdings, which were sold to families. The villages also included a school and a Baptist church.

The Baptists also created, in 1843, the Calabar Theological College for training ministers for local preaching and missions in Africa and the Caribbean, which became part of the United Theological College of the West Indies in 1966. 

In 1849, the Jamaica Baptist Union is officially founded.

Three of Jamaica's National Heroes - Sam Sharpe, Paul Bogle, and George William Gordon - were also Baptist.

In 2018, Karen Kirlew became the first female president of the union.

According to a denomination census released in 2020, it claimed 339 churches and 40,132 members.

See also
 Bible
 Born again
 Baptist beliefs
 Worship service (evangelicalism)
 Jesus Christ
 Believers' Church

References

External links
 Official Website

Baptist Christianity in Jamaica
Evangelicalism
Baptist denominations in the Caribbean